This article is about the particular significance of the year 1782 to Wales and its people.

Incumbents
Lord Lieutenant of Anglesey - Sir Nicholas Bayly, 2nd Baronet (until 1 August) Henry Paget (from 1 August)
Lord Lieutenant of Brecknockshire and Monmouthshire – Charles Morgan of Dderw
Lord Lieutenant of Caernarvonshire - Thomas Bulkeley, 7th Viscount Bulkeley
Lord Lieutenant of Cardiganshire – Wilmot Vaughan, 1st Earl of Lisburne
Lord Lieutenant of Carmarthenshire – John Vaughan  
Lord Lieutenant of Denbighshire - Richard Myddelton  
Lord Lieutenant of Flintshire - Sir Roger Mostyn, 5th Baronet 
Lord Lieutenant of Glamorgan – John Stuart, Lord Mountstuart
Lord Lieutenant of Merionethshire - Sir Watkin Williams-Wynn, 4th Baronet
Lord Lieutenant of Montgomeryshire – George Herbert, 2nd Earl of Powis
Lord Lieutenant of Pembrokeshire – Sir Hugh Owen, 5th Baronet
Lord Lieutenant of Radnorshire – Edward Harley, 4th Earl of Oxford and Earl Mortimer

Bishop of Bangor – John Moore
Bishop of Llandaff – Shute Barrington (until 27 August); Richard Watson (from 20 October)
Bishop of St Asaph – Jonathan Shipley
Bishop of St Davids – John Warren

Events
March - Lloyd Kenyon is appointed Attorney-General.
12 April - In the Battle of the Saintes, the British fleet defeat the French after a campaign in which Admiral Sir Thomas Foley has played a major part.
27 September - Francis Homfray leases a mill from Anthony Bacon of Cyfarthfa ironworks.  (Under the terms of a new Parliamentary Act, Bacon, as an MP, is disqualified from holding government munitions contracts.)
William Owen Pughe and Robert Hughes (Robin Ddu yr Ail o Fôn) meet in London.
David Davis (Castellhywel) settles in Castellhywel.

Arts and literature

New books
William Gilpin - Observations on the River Wye and several parts of South Wales, etc. relative chiefly to Picturesque Beauty; made in the summer of the year 1770
Thomas Pennant - Journey to Snowdon, volume 1
John Walters - Translated Specimens of Welsh Poetry

Music
William Williams Pantycelyn - Rhai Hymnau Newyddion (second in a series of hymn collections)

Births
20 January - Sir William Nott, military leader (died 1845)
29 December - Sir William Lloyd, soldier and mountaineer (died 1857)
unknown date - William Morgan, evangelical clergyman (died 1858)

Deaths
March - John Evans, anti-Methodist clergyman, 79
27 April - William Talbot, 1st Earl Talbot, politician, 71
15 May - Richard Wilson, landscape painter, 54
25 August - Lady Catherine Hamilton, formerly Catherine Barlow of Colby, heiress to an estate in south Pembrokeshire which passed to her nephew Charles Francis Greville
November - John Parry, harpist, 72?
9 December - Sir Nicholas Bayly, 2nd Baronet, Lord Lieutenant of Anglesey, 73

References

Wales
Wales